Matinta is a genus of South American jumping spiders (family Salticidae). The largest number of species are found in Brazil.

Taxonomy
Matinta was first described by G. R. S. Ruiz, Wayne Paul Maddison & María Elena Galiano in 2019. A re-examination of the holotype of the type species of the genus Mago showed that the genus had been misinterpreted, so that species had been included in the genus that did not fit the diagnosis. Accordingly, Ruiz et al. created a new genus, Matinta, to which most of the former Mago genera were transferred. Matinta, like Mago, was placed in the tribe Amycini, part of the Amycoida clade of the subfamily Salticinae.

Species
 it contains nineteen species, found in Ecuador, Brazil, Guyana, Peru, and French Guiana:
Matinta acutidens (Simon, 1900) (type) – Brazil, Guyana
Matinta apophysis (Costa & Ruiz, 2017) – Brazil
Matinta balbina (Patello & Ruiz, 2014) – Brazil
Matinta chickeringi (Caporiacco, 1954) – French Guiana
Matinta delicata (Patello & Ruiz, 2014) – Brazil
Matinta fasciata (Mello-Leitão, 1940) – Guyana
Matinta fonsecai (Soares & Camargo, 1948) – Brazil
Matinta furcata (Costa & Ruiz, 2017) – Ecuador
Matinta jurutiensis (Patello & Ruiz, 2014) – Brazil
Matinta longidens (Simon, 1900) – Brazil, French Guiana
Matinta mimica (Costa & Ruiz, 2017) – Ecuador
Matinta opiparis (Simon, 1900) – Brazil
Matinta pardo (Costa & Ruiz, 2017) – Brazil
Matinta procax (Simon, 1900) – Peru
Matinta saperda (Simon, 1900) – Brazil
Matinta silvae (Crane, 1943) – Guyana, French Guiana
Matinta similis (Patello & Ruiz, 2014) – Brazil
Matinta steindachneri (Taczanowski, 1878) – Peru, Brazil
Matinta vicana (Simon, 1900) – Brazil

References

Salticidae genera
Salticidae